Newberry County is a county located in the U.S. state of South Carolina. As of the 2020 census, its population was 37,719. Its county seat is Newberry. The name is of unknown origin.

Newberry County comprises the Newberry, SC Micropolitan Statistical Area

History
Newberry County was formed from Ninety-Six District in 1785. Prior to its formal founding, the area was the site of several American Revolutionary War battles: Williams' Plantation, Dec. 31, 1780; Mud Lick, March 2, 1781; and Bush River, May 1781.[3]The town of Newberry was founded in 1789 as the county seat and was sometimes called Newberry Courthouse for that reason.

Originally settled by yeomen farmers, in the nineteenth century numerous plantations were established for the cultivation of short-staple cotton. Its processing had been made profitable by invention of the cotton gin. Cotton was the primary crop grown in Newberry County before the American Civil War. Newberry was a trading town, and expanded with the arrival of the railroad in the early 1850s, which connected it to major towns and markets. Newberry College was established by the Lutheran Church in 1856.

The Civil War interrupted growth in the county; the warfare and loss of lives of many southern men disrupted the state economy. The first cotton mills were constructed in the county in the 1880s, and quickly became an important part of the economy and a source of jobs. With the mechanization of agriculture in the early 20th century, labor needs were reduced.

Since the 1970s the population of Newberry County has been growing from 29,416 in 1960 to 37,719 in 2020.

Geography

National protected area
 Belfast Wildlife Management Area (part)
 Sumter National Forest (part)

State and local protected areas 
 Broad River Scenic Area
 Dreher Island State Park
 Rocky Branch Natural Area

Major water bodies 
 Broad River
 Bush River
 Camping Creek
 Cannon's Creek
 Enoree River
 Lake Murray
 Parr Shoals Reservoir
 Saluda River

Adjacent counties 
 Union County - north
 Fairfield County - east
 Lexington County - southeast
 Richland County - southeast
 Saluda County - south
 Greenwood County - southwest
 Laurens County - northwest

Major highways

Major infrastructure
 Newberry County Water & Sewer Authority
 Newberry Electric Cooperative
 Clinton-Newberry Natural Gas Authority

Demographics

2020 census

As of the 2020 United States census, there were 37,719 people, 14,810 households, and 9,705 families residing in the county.

2010 census
As of the 2010 United States Census, there were 37,508 people, 14,709 households, and 10,129 families living in the county. The racial makeup of the county was 62.1% white, 31.0% black or African American, 0.3% Asian, 0.3% American Indian, 0.1% Pacific islander, 5.0% from other races, and 1.2% from two or more races. Those of Hispanic or Latino origin made up 7.2% of the population. In terms of ancestry, 16.8% were German, 14.2% were American, 9.0% were English, and 7.7% were Irish.

Of the 14,709 households, 32.1% had children under the age of 18 living with them, 46.3% were married couples living together, 17.2% had a female householder with no husband present, 31.1% were non-families, and 27.0% of all households were made up of individuals. The average household size was 2.47 and the average family size was 2.97. The median age was 39.9 years.

The median income for a household in the county was $41,815 and the median income for a family was $49,560. Males had a median income of $38,146 versus $28,961 for females. The per capita income for the county was $21,410. About 13.3% of families and 16.6% of the population were below the poverty line, including 25.6% of those under age 18 and 10.9% of those age 65 or over.

2000 census
As of the 2000 census, there were 36,108 people, 14,026 households and 9,804 families living in the county.  The population density was 57 people per square mile (22/km2).  There were 16,805 housing units at an average density of 27 per square mile (10/km2).  The racial makeup of the county was 64.02 percent White, 33.12 percent Black or African American, 0.28 percent Native American, 0.29 percent Asian, 0.09 percent Pacific Islander, 1.30 percent from other races, and 0.90 percent from two or more races.  Some 4.25 percent of the population were Hispanic or Latino of any race.

There were 14,026 households, out of which 30.4 percent had children under the age of 18 living with them, 49.2 percent were married couples living together, 16.1 percent had a female householder with no husband present, and 30.1 percent were non-families. 26.5 percent of all households were made up of individuals, and 12 percent had someone living alone who was 65 years of age or older.  The average household size was 2.5 and the average family size was 2.99.

In the county, the population was spread out, with 24.1 percent under the age of 18, 9.8 percent from 18 to 24, 27.6 percent from 25 to 44, 23.7 percent from 45 to 64, and 14.7 percent who were 65 years of age or older.  The median age was 37 years. For every 100 females there were 93.20 males.  For every 100 females age 18 and over, there were 89.8 males.

The median income for a household in the county was $32,867, and the median income for a family was $40,580. Males had a median income of $29,871 versus $21,274 for females. The per capita income for the county was $16,045.  About 13.6 percent of families and 17 percent of the population were below the poverty line, including 23.8 percent of those under age 18 and 16 percent of those age 65 or over.

Government and politics

Media
Newberry Magazine is a bimonthly magazine, published since 2004, by Summer Media, for Newberry County.

Communities

Cities
 Newberry (county seat and largest city)

Towns
 Little Mountain
 Peak
 Pomaria
 Prosperity
 Silverstreet
 Whitmire

Census-designated place
 Helena

Other unincorporated communities
 Chappells
 Jalapa
 Kinards (partly in Laurens County)

Notable people
 Lee Atwater, famous political consultant

See also
 List of counties in South Carolina
 National Register of Historic Places listings in Newberry County, South Carolina
 South Carolina State Parks
 Red Knoll School House

References

External links

 
 

 
1785 establishments in South Carolina
Populated places established in 1785